The Koonibba Test Range is a rocket test range near the town of Koonibba in the far west of South Australia.

Koonibba Test Range was reported in 2020 to be the world's largest privately owned rocket test range and the world's first permitted by an indigenous community to be launched from their land. The range allows companies, universities, space agencies and other organisations to pay for their rockets to be taken to the site, launched, and rockets and payloads to be recovered.

History
It is to be used for space research and launching and recovering rockets. The advantage of the site is that the land on which the rockets may be recovered is vast. Members of the local community have been employed to set up and operate the range.

DEWC Systems, an Adelaide-based company, conducted two launches at the range in September 2020. A rocket containing a small replica payload was scheduled to be launched on 15 September 2020, with a second launch on 19 September. The first launch failed, but both launches were successful on the morning of 19 September 2020. It was aimed at collecting information to develop a new technology consisting of tiny cube-shaped satellites, known as cubesats, for electronic warfare. The training and employment opportunities were welcomed by the community.

Southern Launch's Whalers Way Orbital Launch Complex, at the tip of the Eyre Peninsula, was planned before Koonibba, but  was under construction.

References

Rocket launch sites
Eyre Peninsula